Bryan Waters (born 21 January 1938) is a former Australian rules footballer who played for Hawthorn in the Victorian Football League (VFL) during the 1950s.

Waters originally played for the Dandenong Football Club in the Federal League, before joining Hawthorn in the VFL. He played with Hawthorn for three seasons, under the coaching of Jack Hale. After leaving the VFL, he returned to Dandenong, which was now playing in the Victorian Football Association, and won the 1959 J. J. Liston Trophy. His younger brother, Terry, was a Best and Fairest winner at Collingwood.

References

Holmesby, Russell and Main, Jim (2007). The Encyclopedia of AFL Footballers. 7th ed. Melbourne: Bas Publishing.

1938 births
Living people
Hawthorn Football Club players
Dandenong Football Club players
J. J. Liston Trophy winners
Australian rules footballers from Victoria (Australia)